Ivor Guy (27 February 1926, in Chipping Sodbury – 1 September 1986, in Bristol) was an English footballer who played as a right back. He made over 400 Football League appearances in the years after the Second World War.

Career
Ivor Guy born in Chipping Sodbury played locally for Hambrook Villa. Bob Hewison signed Guy in August 1944 from Hambrook Villa for Bristol City.

Honours
with Bristol City
Football League Third Division South winner: 1954–55

References

1926 births
1986 deaths
Footballers from Bristol
English footballers
Association football fullbacks
English Football League players
Bristol City F.C. players
Southern Football League players
Bath City F.C. players